This is a list of the 21 members of the European Parliament for the Czech Republic in the 2014 to 2019 session.

List

Party representation

References
 http://www.volby.cz/pls/ep2014/ep11?xjazyk=CZ

2014
List
Czech Republic